is a Buddhist temple located in Uji, Kyoto. It is the head temple of the Japanese Ōbaku Zen sect, named after Wanfu Temple in Fujian, China. The mountain is likewise named after Mount Huangbo, where the Chinese temple is situated.

History
The temple was founded in 1661 by the Chinese monk Yinyuan Longqi (Ingen) and his disciple Muyan.

In 1664, control of the temple passed to Muyan, after many Chinese monks followed as head priests. Only the fourteenth priest and his successors are Japanese.

On May 21, 1673 (Enpō 1, 5th day of the 4th month) Yinyuan (Ingen) dies here.

The art of Senchadō is closely tied to the temple due to its founder.

Architecture
The temple structures were constructed in Ming China's architectural style.

The arrangement of buildings also follows Ming Dynasty architectural style, representing an image of a dragon.

The temple features an exemplary gyoban (fish board, used to toll the hours).

Art
The temple treasure house contains a complete collection of Buddhist scriptures completed in 1678 and comprising approximately 60,000 printing blocks, which are still in use. The production of the printing blocks was funded by donations collected throughout the country for many years.

The temple's main statue is a seated Gautama Buddha.

Sculptures by the Chinese sculptor known as Han Do-sei and latticed balustrades can also be seen.

Gallery

See also
Japanese Buddhism
Zen
Egoku Dōmyō
Glossary of Japanese Buddhism—explanation of terms concerning Japanese Buddhism, Japanese Buddhist art, and Japanese Buddhist temple architecture

Notes

References
 Titsingh, Isaac. (1834). Annales des empereurs du Japon.  Paris: Oriental Translation Fund of Great Britain and Ireland.  OCLC 251800045; see also  Imprimerie Royale de France,

External links

 Manpuku-ji – official page (map) 

1661 establishments in Japan
Buddhist temples in Kyoto Prefecture
Obaku temples
Religious organizations established in the 1660s
Important Cultural Properties of Japan